Norman Douglas Somerville Provan (18 December 1932 – 13 October 2021) was an Australian professional rugby league footballer and coach. Also nicknamed "Sticks", he was a second-row forward with the St George Dragons during the first ten of their eleven consecutive premiership-winning years, from 1956 to 1966. Named among the nation's finest footballers of the 20th century, he was a representative in the Australia national team from 1954 to 1960, earning 14 Tests and two World Cups. In 2018, he was inducted as the 13th Immortal of Australian rugby league.

Club career and player-coach
Provan's first junior football was played for Willoughby Roos in the North Sydney District and attending high school at Crows Nest. After his family relocated to the St George-Sutherland region, he played with the Sutherland Woronora Juniors and the Sutherland Gravediggers. He was graded by St George in 1950 after being turned down by Easts the prior year. Having won the premiership in 1949, St George slipped to a fifth-place finish in 1950 but things were falling into place that year with the move to Jubilee Oval, Frank Facer's move from player to club selector and committeeman and Provan's arrival.

Provan featured in their 1951 campaign – a loss in the final against Manly for 3rd place; a 2nd place in the minor premiership in 1952 and a semi-final exit to North Sydney; and then the 1953 Dragons side that lost the 1953 final to South Sydney. St George and Souths would battle head-to-head on many more occasions in Provan's illustrious career.

Provan's strength at second row in attack and in defence, in partnership with Harry Melville, Harry Bath and Monty Porter laid the foundations in those first years of their glory run. After the retirement of Ken Kearney in 1962 from the playing arena, and given the Dragons administrators' preference for a player-coach, Provan took over as captain-coach and the club's dominant run continued.

A fitness fanatic himself, Provan continued Kearney's punishing and successful training routine giving Dragon sides of the period confidence that they could edge out their fatiguing opposition in the final twenty minutes of each encounter. Provan set high standards for himself and his players directing a training mix that included sandhill running at Cronulla; lap running at Kogarah and touch-football. He was content to maintain a certain distance from the team and saw the captain-coach role as a tough, solitary role requiring him to stand slightly apart from his players. A teetotaler later in life, Provan occasionally shared a drink in the shed after a match but he would rarely finish the first beer. 

Provan holds the club record of 284 games for St George achieved between 1951 and 1965. He played in the first ten of their record run of 11 premiership victories – as captain-coach for four – and made 30 finals appearances for the club over fifteen consecutive seasons. His last game before retirement was a victory in the 1965 Grand Final where the Dragons beat the Rabbitohs 12–8 in front of 78,065 which stands as the Sydney Cricket Ground's all-time attendance record.

Representative career
In 1954 Provan first represented for New South Wales and that same year made his Test debut, playing in all three matches of the 1954 series against the visiting Great Britain side commencing a representative second-row partnership with Wests Kel O'Shea that would continue for a number of years.

Provan was selected for the 1956 Kangaroo tour. Due to injury he missed the Ashes series against Great Britain but appeared in three Tests against France at the end of the tour. He appeared in 15 other minor matches on the tour. In 1957 he was a member of Australia's victorious World Cup squad.

He continued his Test pairing with Kel O'Shea in all three games of the domestic 1958 series against Great Britain and in 1959 featured in all three Tests against the visiting Kiwis. Also in 1959 Provan played in the New South Wales loss to Queensland that attracted 35,261 spectators, smashing Brisbane's previous record for an interstate match of 22,817.

Family priorities and business commitments caused him to cut short his representative career starting with the 1959 Kangaroo tour and he made his final national appearance in the 1960 series against France.

Provan is listed on the Australian Players Register as Kangaroo No. 310.

Non-playing coach
After retiring from playing he went on to coach. He was a non-playing coach for St George for a season in 1968 and with Parramatta for a single season in 1975. Under his stewardship the club won the Pre-Season Cup (Wills Cup), the club's maiden first-grade title, and fell one game short of making their first Grand Final appearance.

He had two seasons coaching Cronulla-Sutherland in 1978 and 1979 taking them to a grand final in 1978 which they lost to Manly.

Records
He played in finals football for fifteen consecutive seasons from 1951 to 1965. Along with Brian Clay, his appearance in ten Grand Finals is an Australian rugby league record. His victory statistic of ten consecutive first-grade premierships is a world record in rugby league and a world class achievement in any top-grade team sport. In the 1962 Grand Final at the age of 29 years and 271 days, he became the youngest person to ever coach a side to premiership victory in a Grand Final, a record that still stands.

His brother Peter Provan played alongside him at St George in the 1958 and 1959 Grand Finals and later captained the Balmain Tigers to their 1969 Grand Final victory. Together Norm and Peter are the only brothers to have led different Australian first-grade rugby league sides to premiership victories.

Accolades
Provan was awarded Life Membership of the St George Dragons club in 1963.

The Gladiators – Provan is the subject of one of the most memorable sporting photographic images ever captured in Australia. The 1963 NSW Rugby League Premiership grand final between long term rivals Western Suburbs and St George was played in a torrential downpour on Saturday, 24 August. This, combined with the fact that the centre cricket pitch area of Sydney Cricket Ground was notoriously muddy in such conditions, ensured that the players were not only saturated but also caked in mud from head to toe. At the conclusion of the hard-fought match, which was won by St George, the captains of the two teams, the very tall Norm Provan and more diminutive Arthur Summons, embraced in appreciation of each other's stoic efforts. The moment was captured by a newspaper photographer, John O'Gready, and published in the following day's Sun Herald. Subsequently, the image won several awards, becoming known as The Gladiators. This image was the inspiration for the current premiership trophy's bronze statue.

In 2004 Provan was admitted into the Australian Rugby League Hall of Fame. In 2007 he was selected by a panel of experts at second-row in an Australian 'Team of the 50s'.

In February 2008, Provan was named in the list of Australia's 100 Greatest Players (1908–2007) which was commissioned by the NRL and ARL to celebrate the code's centenary year in Australia. Provan went on to be named in the second-row in Australian rugby league's Team of the Century. Announced on 17 April 2008, the team is the panel's majority choice for each of the thirteen starting positions and four interchange players. In 2008 New South Wales announced their rugby league team of the century also and Provan was again named at second-row.

In October 2015, Provan was inducted into the Sport Australia Hall of Fame.

In 2018 Provan was inducted as a Rugby League Immortal along with Mal Meninga and pre-WWII greats Dave Brown, Frank Burge and Dally Messenger.
On 20 July 2022, Provan was named in the St. George Dragons District Rugby League Clubs team of the century.

Reflections
Provan wrote the introduction to the Haddan book The Finals – 100 Years and reflected upon the dressing room mood before the momentous 1965 Grand Final: 
{{cquote
|It's 1965, St George and Souths in the grand final at the Sydney Cricket Ground. It's five minutes before we walk out. The boys are sitting around, very quiet now, just thinking about their own games. I have finished my last 10-minute talk to the team, just a summary of our general plan – no shouting or yelling or 'geeing' up. These players just don't need that. I have this terrible sick feeling in my gut. We have to lose a grand final sooner or later. The law of averages demands it. This one would make it 10. A nice round figure and I can retire happy. The linesman comes to the door, looks at me and nods. I nod back. We all stand up. The sick feeling is gone. 'Let's give it another go!'''.|30px|30px|Haddan, Introduction px|}}

References
 Writer, Larry (1995) Never Before, Never Again, Pan MacMillan, Sydney
 Whiticker, Alan & Hudson, Glen (2006) The Encyclopedia of Rugby League Players, Gavin Allen Publishing, Sydney
 Andrews, Malcolm (2006) The ABC of Rugby League Austn Broadcasting Corpn, Sydney
 Haddan, Steve (2007) The Finals – 100 Years of National Rugby League Finals, Steve Haddan Publishing, Brisbane
 Apter, Jeff The Coaches : The Men Who Changed Rugby League'' (2014), The Five Mile Press Scoresby, Victoria

Footnotes

External links
Norm Provan at eraofthebiff.com
"Immortal designate: Raper pushes for Provan ahead of Andrew Johns" BY BRAD FORREST 12 February 2008 (Fairfax Digital)

1932 births
2021 deaths
Australia national rugby league team players
Australian rugby league coaches
Australian rugby league players
Clive Churchill Medal winners
Cronulla-Sutherland Sharks coaches
Parramatta Eels coaches
Rugby league players from New South Wales
Rugby league second-rows
Sport Australia Hall of Fame inductees
Recipients of the Australian Sports Medal
St. George Dragons coaches
St. George Dragons players